The Sacred Heart Cathedral is a religious building of the Catholic Church, which is part of the Metropolitan Archdiocese of Anqing in China. Following the changes of 2001, it is considered by the Chinese authorities as a church belonging to the great diocese of Anhui. Neither the state nor the administrative divisions are recognized by the Holy See.

History
The church follows the Roman or Latin rite and was built in 1872 under the direction of the French Jesuits. On February 21, 1929, with the creation of the Archdiocese of Anqing, the church received the status of cathedral. Between 1957 and 1983, the Catholic religion was banned. With the political and economic opening of China and the change in religious policy, the cathedral once again became a place of worship, and has been that way since 1983. It is also part of the protected monuments of Anhui Province.

See also
Roman Catholicism in China
Sacred Heart Cathedral (disambiguation)

References

Roman Catholic cathedrals in China
Buildings and structures in Anqing
Roman Catholic churches completed in 1872
19th-century Roman Catholic church buildings in China